The 1985 NFL draft was the procedure by which National Football League teams selected amateur college football players. The draft was held April 30 and May 1, 1985, at the Omni Park Central Hotel in New York City, New York. The league also held a supplemental draft after the regular draft and before the regular season.

The first six selections of the draft made at least one Pro Bowl, and three of the first 16 picks — Bruce Smith, Chris Doleman, and Jerry Rice — have been inducted into the Pro Football Hall of Fame.

For the second consecutive draft, there were no quarterbacks chosen in the first round (Day One). The Buffalo Bills used the first overall pick of the draft to select defensive end Bruce Smith. Randall Cunningham was the first quarterback selected (second round) by the Philadelphia Eagles. Of note, University of Miami quarterback Bernie Kosar was taken by the Cleveland Browns in the supplemental draft several months later.

Player selections

Round one

Round two

Round three

Round four

Round five

Round six

Round seven

Round eight

Round nine

Round ten

Round eleven

Round twelve

Hall of Famers
 Bruce Smith, defensive end from Virginia Tech, taken in 1st round 1st overall by Buffalo Bills
Inducted: Professional Football Hall of Fame class of 2009.
 Jerry Rice, wide receiver from Mississippi Valley State, taken in 1st round 16th overall by San Francisco 49ers
Inducted: Professional Football Hall of Fame class of 2010.
 Chris Doleman, defensive end from Pittsburgh, taken in 1st round 4th overall by Minnesota Vikings
Inducted: Professional Football Hall of Fame class of 2012.
 Andre Reed, wide receiver from Kutztown, taken in 4th round 86th overall by Buffalo Bills
Inducted: Professional Football Hall of Fame class of 2014.
 Kevin Greene, linebacker from Auburn, taken in 5th round 113rd overall by Los Angeles Rams
Inducted: Professional Football Hall of Fame class of 2016.

Notable undrafted players

Notes and references

External links
 NFL.com – 1985 Draft
 databaseFootball.com – 1985 Draft
 Pro Football Hall of Fame
 Bruce Smith elected to Professional Football Hall of Fame
 Pro Sports Transactions

National Football League Draft
NFL Draft
Draft
NFL Draft
NFL Draft
NFL Draft
American football in New York City
1980s in Manhattan
Sporting events in New York City
Sports in Manhattan